SHODAN (Sentient Hyper-Optimized Data Access Network) is a fictional artificial intelligence and the main antagonist of the cyberpunk-horror themed video games System Shock and System Shock 2.

Character design
SHODAN is an artificial intelligence whose moral restraints were removed from her programming by a hacker in order for Edward Diego, station chief of Citadel Station, on which SHODAN was installed, to delete compromising files regarding illegal experiments and his corruption. She is a megalomaniac with a god complex and sees humans as little better than insects, something which she constantly reminds the player of. Her words are accompanied by stuttering, fluctuating voice pitch, shifts of timbre, and the presence of three voices speaking the same words with the constituent voices alternately lagging behind and leading ahead in different patterns, as well as computer glitches resembling a sound card malfunction. The disc version refers to SHODAN as either an 'it' or a 'he', while the later CD version uses 'she'. On screens, SHODAN manifests herself as an eerie-looking green and/or grey female cybernetic face that usually wears a malevolent expression, and speaks with a chaotic, discordant voice. She is voiced by former Tribe keyboardist and vocalist, Terri Brosius, the wife of System Shock 2'''s sound editor, Eric Brosius, who distorted the samples to provide the distinctive SHODAN effect. In the cyberspace of System Shock, she is initially represented as an inverted blue-grey cone, reminiscent of the Master Control Program from the 1982 Disney film Tron. After she has been hacked, the cone turns red, the surface becomes covered in rough metallic material and four "tentacles" or "claws" grow from the top, with her actual face starting to form above that.

Appearances
SHODAN was created on Earth to serve as the artificial intelligence of the TriOptimum Corporation's research and mining space station Citadel Station, which orbits around Saturn. She was hacked by the game's protagonist (at the behest of the corrupt corporate Vice President Edward Diego, in exchange for a military-grade neural implant, and amnesty) and, to access the vital information about TriOptimum corporation, its ethical restrictions were removed, starting a process that eventually resulted in the AI going rogue, seizing control of the station's systems, robots and considerable defenses, and either slaughtering the whole staff or converting them into mutants and cyborgs—with the sole exception of its "creator", the unnamed hacker whom the player controls. Basically omnipresent and the de facto ruler of Citadel Station, SHODAN watches from security cameras, stares out of screens and monitors, sends threats and snide messages over the station's PA system or via email to the player's data reader, and sometimes cuts off communications from friendly sources to prevent the hacker from advancing in his goals. Though she commands a small army of cyborgs and mutants, she wields physical power of her own, and thwarting more than one of her schemes has to be done with the AI's screams and threats in the background.

In System Shock, the player ejects a garden grove pod from Citadel Station. The grove contains one of SHODAN's processing components and part of her grand biological experiment. The pod crash lands on the planet Tau Ceti V and she survives by hibernating for the next 42 years. After both are brought aboard the starship Von Braun and SHODAN is reactivated, she discovers the experiment is no longer at her command and begins to enlist humans to aid her in destroying her creations. The player character in System Shock 2 is a soldier cybernetically modified by SHODAN to serve as her avatar. Her involvement in the game's goings-on is not disclosed up front, but only subtly hinted at in the game's early portions. She only reveals herself to the player during a moment of despair, at the same time the player discovers that Dr. Polito, the player's trusted guide for the first portion of the game, has been dead all along, as she committed suicide when she realized what SHODAN had done and was going to do. At that point SHODAN announces:

After the player's and SHODAN's mutual enemies have been defeated, the player enters her expanding new reality—created via her manipulation of the Von Braun's reality-warping faster-than-light engine—and defeats her. However, as shown in an epilogue at the end of the game, SHODAN apparently lives on by taking over a woman who fled the Von Braun in an escape pod. The upcoming System Shock 3 is planned to follow immediately from these events, with Brosius returning to voice SHODAN.

In another Origin Systems' game, Crusader: No Remorse, an article came bundled with the release of the game providing details on the unveiling of a confidential research endeavor known as Project: SHODAN from the Cybernetics Cartel in Chicago. The article describes Project: SHODAN as "a program that's not only capable of human-like thought and emotion, but that also far surpasses human intelligence levels" and includes an image similar to SHODAN's appearance in the first game. However, despite a reference to the origins of SHODAN, Crusader: No Remorse takes place nearly 120 years after the events of System Shock.

Reception

The character was very well received by the gaming media outlets, with many publications considering SHODAN one of the top villains in the history of video games. GameSpot named her one of the ten best computer game villains, comparing her to HAL 9000, though noting that unlike Hal, SHODAN was unquestionably aware of her actions and the consequences of them. GameSpot also chose her as one of the 64 characters competing for the title of "All-Time Greatest Game Villain". In 2006, IGN listed SHODAN at number four in their list of top most memorable video game villains, praising the character for her constant physical and mental assaults against the player throughout the games. In another such list, IGN stated that "her villainy and voice won't ever be forgotten by anyone who checked out the System Shock games, and no doubt influenced other video game villains, such as Valve's GLaDOS from Portal." In 2008, The Boston Phoenix named SHODAN as the greatest boss in video game history, while GamePro ranked her as the 12th "most diabolical" video game villain ever, calling her "far more crafty than Skynet or the machines of the Matrix, simply because she's omnipresent and constantly taunting," and adding that "you'll want to kill SHODAN more than you've ever wanted to kill any videogame enemy. Ever." That same year, Joe Martin of Bit-tech ranked SHODAN as the fourth top PC game NPC of all time, while GameDaily ranked her at number eleven on the list of top evil masterminds of all time, stating that even Halo's 343 Guilty Spark "got nothing" on her and expressing hope for the character's return in a new game. Complex ranked her as the third "coolest" video game villain of all time in 2012. GamesRadar too praised SHODAN's role as an antagonist, putting her in their 2013 list of the best villains in video game history at number 15.

SHODAN has been often praised as one of the best female characters in gaming, such as in an early list by GameSpot that also described her as an unforgettable villain due to her personality and adding that "[she is] more believable than most game characters are, and in many ways, she actually seems more human." In 2007, Tom's Games listed her as one of the top 50 greatest female characters in video game history, stating that "there have been memorable villains in video game history, but none quite like SHODAN". In 2008, she was featured in play magazine's "Girls of Gaming" as one of the staff's top girls of PC gaming, placing tenth on their list. Complex ranked SHODAN as the 12th "most diabolical video game she-villain" in 2012, and as fourth on the 2012 list of the most evil women in video games, "old school but she still makes the cut." In 2013, Liz Lanier of Game Informer included SHODAN among top ten female villains in video games, stating that "SHODAN may not be a woman in the traditional considering she's an AI, but what she lacks in femininity and humanity, makes up in creepiness. Her distorted voice is enough to send shivers up even the most seasoned gamer's spine."

Other articles noted her one of the most horrific video game bosses ever, such as in the 2008 GameDaily article noting her constant assault upon the player and humanity despite being unable to harm him directly. In 2009, GamesRadar listed SHODAN as one of the scariest video game characters ever, describing her as the precursor to GLaDOS. In 2010, she was ranked as the third greatest video game character of all time by Empire, who stated that "SHODAN's constant, threatening presence is a masterstroke of game design." Complex ranked her as the fifth most scary video game enemies at number five in 2011, stating that "though this malevolent AI is hard to quantify in terms of toughness, her constant presence, and the subsequent psychological damage she causes through her previous actions, is enough to land her on the list." In 2012, Cheat Code Central ranked SHODAN in System Shock 2'' as the third most terrifying video game character of all time.

References

External links

"The Girl Who Wanted To Be God" (no longer available, archived by "archive.org"), a 2006 essay on SHODAN by Kieron Gillen

Anthropomorphic video game characters
Artificial intelligence characters in video games
Female characters in video games
Female video game villains
Fictional computers
Fictional gynoids
Fictional mass murderers
Narcissism in fiction
Fictional software
Horror video game characters
Robot characters in video games
Role-playing video game characters
Science fiction video game characters
System Shock
Video game bosses
Video game characters introduced in 1994